Miss World Ecuador 2015, was the 3rd edition of the Miss World Ecuador that was held on August 1, 2015 where Virginia Limongi from Manabí crowned Camila Marañón from Manabí as her successor. The winner will compete at Miss World 2015.

Results

Placements

Special awards

Official contestants

Notes

Debuts

 Loja
  Morona Santiago
  Santa Elena

Returns

Last compete in:

2013 
  Santo Domingo
 Tungurahua

Withdraws

  Pichincha

Crossovers

Cristina Vintimilla was Reina de Cuenca 2013.
Priscilla Naranjo was Reina de Latacunga 2012.
Viviana Yaguachi competed at Reina de Esmeraldas 2013 but she was unplaced.
Susan Punin was the 1st Runner-up (Virreina) at Reina de Babahoyo 2015.
Camila Marañón was Reina de Chone 2013, and earlier in 2015 she withdrew from the pageant Miss Ecuador 2015. 
Jhomara Montero was Reina de Sucúa 2010 and Reina de Morona Santiago 2010.
Vanessa Kattan was Reina de Ambato 2014 and Reina Mundial de la Rosa 2015

References

Beauty pageants in Ecuador
2015